From Beijing With Love is a 1994 Hong Kong spy comedy film directed by Stephen Chow and Lee Lik-chi. The film is a very direct spoof of the James Bond films.

Synopsis
Golden Gun steals the cranium of China's only dinosaur fossil. Chow, starring as a hawker-secret-agent 007, is sent to Hong Kong by a high-ranking government official to recapture the cranium. When he arrives in Hong Kong, he meets Lee Heung-kam (Anita Yuen), who proposes to help him in his endeavour. However, Heung-kam turns out to be a subordinate of Golden Gun. Golden Gun is in actuality the government official who directs 007 to find the cranium.

Golden Gun instructs Heung-kam to send 007 on a false lead and tells him that the cranium may have been stolen by a smuggler. 007, with the help of Heung-kam, sneaks into a cocktail party held by the smuggler. Before he enters, he tells Heung-kam that he will fetch her some white roses. Heung-kam tells 007 to find evidence that the smuggler stole the cranium; meanwhile, Heung-kam hides in a tree, planning to snipe 007 from afar. The party is interrupted by a mysterious man (modelled after Jaws from James Bond) and a mysterious woman who are out to kill 007. Taking this opportunity, Heung-kam shoots 007 several times, including once in the leg with 007 thinking another assassin has shot him. 007 (who is wearing a bulletproof vest but not bulletproof trousers) escapes, grabbing three white roses on the way out. Heung-kam is touched by this gesture and saves his life. She decides to defect from Golden Gun. Together, the two destroy the organisation that is behind the theft of the cranium. 007 eventually wins the hand of Heung-kam and is rewarded with a meat cleaver emblazoned with the calligraphy of Deng Xiaoping.

Cast 
 Stephen Chow as Ling-ling-chat (Homophonic pun of '007' in Cantonese)
 Anita Yuen as Lee Heung-kam
 Law Kar-ying as Tat Man-sai (another Homophonic pun of Leonardo da Vinci, transliterated in Cantonese)
 Pauline Chan as mystery woman
 Lee Lik-chi as man about to be executed/martial arts master
 Wong Yat-fei as man about to be executed
 Yu Rongguang as Chinese agent killed by Golden Gun
 Lee Kin-yan as Regent Motel's manager
 Yip Chun as Deputy Commander Chan
 Leung Hak-shun as Lai Yau-wai
 Spencer Leung as man about to be executed
 Johnny Dang Siu-Juen as man about to be executed
 Raymond Tsang as man from Hunan
 Joe Cheng Cho as Metal Death Killer (clearly based on Jaws from Moonraker)
 Indra Leech as guard
 Wong Kam-kong as Golden Gun, masquerading as Yuen, Ling's Commander
 Jerry Ku as firing squad commander
 Chow Yee-Fan as bald waiter
 Quinton Wong Liu-Che as photographer
 Wong Kar-Leung as soldier
 So Wai-Nam as soldier
 Tang Tai-Wo as soldier
 Lam Kwok-Kit as soldier
 Chung Wing as soldier
 Wong Shiu-Keung as hotel clerk
 Lo Gwok-Wai as firing squad soldier

Sources:

Salutation to other films 

 The name of the film in Chinese means "the domestically-produced 007".
 The scene where Stephen Chow drinks a dry martini is a reference to a scene from Chungking Express, where Tony Leung Chiu Wai drinks coffee.
 The scene where Stephen Chow meets Anita Yuen wearing a green blouse in the park feeding dogs is a direct reference to a scene in the film C'est la vie, mon chéri, also featuring Anita Yuen.
 The name of the "ultimate weapon" invented by Da Wen Xi, 要你命3000 (Lifetaker 3000), is also the name of a Hong Kong, low-budget blue movie.
 The scene where the camera pans slowly around a room of various James Bond posters to focus on Stephen Chow combing his hair and admiring himself in the mirror is a parody of the last scene of Days of Being Wild, in which Tony Leung prepares to go out.  The music used is the same.
 The Universe Laser DVD cover (pictured on right) of the movie parodies that of the 1987 James Bond movie The Living Daylights.
 The Golden Gun's signature weapon is a spoof of the golden gun used in the James Bond novel The Man with the Golden Gun. Unlike the one from the James Bond series, this one shoots out extremely powerful explosive bullets instead of a one-hit fatal fragmentation bullet.

Music

Box office and  reception
The film grossed HK$37,523,850 in Hong Kong and has garnered positive reviews in Taiwan as well.
The review aggregator Rotten Tomatoes reported an approval rating of 50%, based on 6 reviews.

Award nominations

References

External links

From Beijing with Love at Hong Kong Cinemagic
From Beijing with Love at lovehkfilm
From Beijing with Love at chinesemov.com

1994 films
1994 action comedy films
1990s Cantonese-language films
1990s parody films
1990s spy comedy films
Film censorship in China
Films directed by Lee Lik-chi
Films directed by Stephen Chow
Films set in Hong Kong
Films shot in Hong Kong
Hong Kong action comedy films
Hong Kong martial arts comedy films
Hong Kong slapstick comedy films
Parody films based on James Bond films
1990s Hong Kong films